Myakinnitsyno is a rural locality (a village) and the administrative center of Verkhnevarzhenskoye Rural Settlement, Velikoustyugsky District, Vologda Oblast, Russia. The population was 256 as of 2002.

Geography 
Myakinnitsyno is located 73 km southeast of Veliky Ustyug (the district's administrative centre) by road. Andronovo is the nearest rural locality.

References 

Rural localities in Velikoustyugsky District